Grief is the response to loss, particularly to the loss of someone or some living thing that has died, to which a bond or affection was formed. Although conventionally focused on the emotional response to loss, grief also has physical, cognitive, behavioral, social, cultural, spiritual and philosophical dimensions. While the terms are often used interchangeably, bereavement refers to the state of loss, while grief is the reaction to that loss.

The grief associated with death is familiar to most people, but individuals grieve in connection with a variety of losses throughout their lives, such as unemployment, ill health or the end of a relationship. Loss can be categorized as either physical or abstract; physical loss is related to something that the individual can touch or measure, such as losing a spouse through death, while other types of loss are more abstract, possibly relating to aspects of a person's social interactions.

Grieving process 
Between 1996 and 2006, there was extensive skepticism about a universal and predictable "emotional pathway" that leads from distress to "recovery" with an appreciation that grief is a more complex process of adapting to loss than stage and phase models have previously suggested. The two-track model of bereavement, created by Simon Shimshon Rubin in 1981, is a grief theory that provided a deeper focus on the grieving process. The model examines the long-term effects of bereavement by measuring how well the person is adapting to the loss of a significant person in their life. The main objective of the two-track model of bereavement is for the individual to "manage and live in reality in which the deceased is absent" as well as returning to normal biological functioning.

Track One is focused on the biopsychosocial functioning of grief. This focuses on the anxiety, depression, somatic concerns, traumatic responses, familial relationships, interpersonal relationships, self-esteem, meaning structure, work, and investment in life tasks. Rubin (2010) points out, "Track 1, the range of aspects of the individuals functioning across affective, interpersonal, somatic and classical psychiatric indicators is considered". All of the terms listed above are noted for the importance they have in relation to people's responses to grief and loss.

The significance of the closeness between the bereaved and the deceased is important to Track 1 because this could determine the severity of the mourning and grief the bereaved will endure. This first track is the response to the extremely stressful life events and requires adaptation along with change and integration. The second track focuses on the ongoing relationship between the griever and the deceased. Track two mainly focuses on how the bereaved was connected to the deceased, and on what level of closeness was shared. The two main components considered are memories, both positive and negative, and emotional involvement shared with the decedent. The stronger the relationship to the deceased, the greater the evaluation of the relationship with heightened shock.

Any memory could be a trigger for the bereaved, the way the bereaved chose to remember their loved ones, and how the bereaved integrate the memory of their loved ones into their daily lives.

Ten main attributes to this track include: imagery/memory, emotional distance, positive effect, negative effect, preoccupation with the loss, conflict, idealization, memorialization/transformation of the loss, impact on self-perception and loss process (shock, searching, disorganized). An outcome of this track is being able to recognize how transformation has occurred beyond grief and mourning. By outlining the main aspects of the bereavement process into two interactive tracks, individuals can examine and understand how grief has affected their life following loss and begin to adapt to this post-loss life. The Model offers a better understanding with the duration of time in the wake of one's loss and the outcomes that evolve from death. By using this model, researchers can effectively examine the response to an individual's loss by assessing the behavioral-psychological functioning and the relationship with the deceased.

The authors from What's Your Grief?, Litza Williams and Eleanor Haley, state in their understanding of the clinical and therapeutic uses of the model:

"The Two-Track Model of Bereavement can help specify areas of mutuality (how people respond affectivity to trauma and change) and also difference (how bereaved people may be preoccupied with the deceased following loss compared to how they may be preoccupied with trauma following the exposure to it)" (Rubin, S.S, 1999).

While the grief response is considered a natural way of dealing with loss, prolonged, highly intense grief may at times become debilitating enough to be considered a disorder.

Reactions 
 Crying is a normal and natural part of grieving. It has also been found, however, that crying and talking about the loss is not the only healthy response and, if forced or excessive, can be harmful. Responses or actions in the affected person, called "coping ugly" by researcher George Bonanno, may seem counter-intuitive or even appear dysfunctional, e.g., celebratory responses, laughter, or self-serving bias in interpreting events. Lack of crying is also a natural, healthy reaction, potentially protective of the individual, and may also be seen as a sign of resilience.

Science has found that some healthy people who are grieving do not spontaneously talk about the loss. Pressing people to cry or retell the experience of a loss can be damaging. Genuine laughter is healthy. When a loved one dies, it is not unusual for the bereaved to report that they have "seen" or "heard" the person they have lost. Most people who have experienced this report feeling comforted. In a 2008 survey conducted by Amanda Barusch, 27% of respondents who had lost a loved one reported having had this kind of "contact" experience.

Bereavement science

Bonanno's four trajectories of grief 

George Bonanno, a professor of clinical psychology at Columbia University, conducted more than two decades of scientific studies on grief and trauma, which have been published in several papers in the most respected peer-reviewed journals in the field of psychology, such as Psychological Science and The Journal of Abnormal Psychology. Subjects of his studies number in the several thousand and include people who have suffered losses in the U.S. and cross-cultural studies in various countries around the world, such as Israel, Bosnia-Herzegovina, and China. His subjects suffered losses through war, terrorism, deaths of children, premature deaths of spouses, sexual abuse, childhood diagnoses of AIDS, and other potentially devastating loss events or potential trauma events.

In Bonanno's book, The Other Side of Sadness: What the New Science of Bereavement Tells Us About Life After a Loss, he summarizes his research. His findings include that a natural resilience is the main component of grief and trauma reactions. The first researcher to use pre-loss data, he outlined four trajectories of grief. Bonanno's work has also demonstrated that absence of grief or trauma symptoms is a healthy outcome, rather than something to be feared as has been the thought and practice until his research. Because grief responses can take many forms, including laughter, celebration, and bawdiness, in addition to sadness, Bonanno coined the phrase "coping ugly" to describe the idea that some forms of coping may seem counter intuitive. Bonanno has found that resilience is natural to humans, suggesting that it cannot be "taught" through specialized programs and that there is virtually no existing research with which to design resilience training, nor is there existing research to support major investment in such things as military resilience training programs.

The four trajectories are as follows:
 Resilience: "The ability of adults in otherwise normal circumstances who are exposed to an isolated and potentially highly disruptive event, such as the death of a close relation or a violent or life-threatening situation, to maintain relatively stable, healthy levels of psychological and physical functioning" as well as "the capacity for generative experiences and positive emotions".
 Recovery: When "normal functioning temporarily gives way to threshold or sub-threshold psychopathology (e.g., symptoms of depression or post-traumatic stress disorder, or PTSD), usually for a period of at least several months, and then gradually returns to pre-event levels".
 Chronic dysfunction: Prolonged suffering and inability to function, usually lasting several years or longer.
 Delayed grief or trauma: When adjustment seems normal but then distress and symptoms increase months later. Researchers have not found evidence of delayed grief, but delayed trauma appears to be a genuine phenomenon.

Five stages theory 

The Kübler-Ross model, commonly known as the five stages of grief, is a theory first introduced by Elisabeth Kübler-Ross in her 1969 book, On Death and Dying. Based on the uncredited earlier work of John Bowlby and Colin Murray-Parkes, Kübler-Ross actually applied the stages to persons who were dying, not persons who were grieving. Her studies involved her work with the terminally ill. The popular but empirically unsupported model describes in five distinct stages how people deal with their impending death.

The five stages are:
 denial
 anger
 bargaining
 depression
 acceptance

The theory holds that the stages are a part of the framework that helps people learn to live without what they have lost.

The stages model, which came about in the 1960s, is a theory based on observation of people who are dying, not people who experienced the death of a loved one. This model found limited empirical support in a study by Maciejewski et al. That is that the sequence was correct although Acceptance was highest at all points throughout the persons experience. The research of George Bonanno, however, is acknowledged as debunking the five stages of grief because his large body of peer-reviewed studies show that the vast majority of people who have experienced a loss are resilient and that there are multiple trajectories following loss.

Physiological and neurological processes 

Studies of fMRI scans of women from whom grief was elicited about the death of a mother or a sister in the past 5 years resulted in the conclusion that grief produced a local inflammation response as measured by salivary concentrations of pro-inflammatory cytokines. These responses were correlated with activation in the anterior cingulate cortex and orbitofrontal cortex. This activation also correlated with the free recall of grief-related word stimuli. This suggests that grief can cause stress, and that this reaction is linked to the emotional processing parts of the frontal lobe. Activation of the anterior cingulate cortex and vagus nerve is similarly implicated in the experience of heartbreak whether due to social rejection or bereavement.

Among those persons who have been bereaved within the previous three months of a given report, those who report many intrusive thoughts about the deceased show ventral amygdala and rostral anterior cingulate cortex hyperactivity to reminders of their loss. In the case of the amygdala, this links to their sadness intensity. In those individuals who avoid such thoughts, there is a related opposite type of pattern in which there is a decrease in the activation of the dorsal amygdala and the dorsolateral prefrontal cortex.

In those not so emotionally affected by reminders of their loss, studies of fMRI scans have been used to conclude that there is a high functional connectivity between the dorsolateral prefrontal cortex and amygdala activity, suggesting that the former regulates activity in the latter. In those people who had greater intensity of sadness, there was a low functional connection between the rostral anterior cingulate cortex and amygdala activity, suggesting a lack of regulation of the former part of the brain upon the latter.

Evolutionary theories 

From an evolutionary perspective, grief is perplexing because it appears costly, and it is not clear what benefits it provides the sufferer. Several researchers have proposed functional explanations for grief, attempting to solve this puzzle. Sigmund Freud argued that grief is a process of libidinal reinvestment. The griever must, Freud argued, disinvest from the deceased, which is a painful process. But this disinvestment allows the griever to use libidinal energies on other, possibly new attachments, so it provides a valuable function. John Archer, approaching grief from an attachment theory perspective, argued that grief is a byproduct of the human attachment system. Generally, a grief-type response is adaptive because it compels a social organism to search for a lost individual (e.g., a mother or a child). However, in the case of death, the response is maladaptive because the individual is not simply lost and the griever cannot reunite with the deceased. Grief, from this perspective, is a painful cost of the human capacity to form commitments.

Other researchers such as Randolph Nesse have proposed that grief is a kind of psychological pain that orients the sufferer to a new existence without the deceased and creates a painful but instructive memory. If, for example, leaving an offspring alone at a watering hole led to the offspring's death, grief creates an intensively painful memory of the event, dissuading a parent from ever again leaving an offspring alone at a watering hole. More recently, Bo Winegard and colleagues argued that grief might be a socially selected signal of an individual's propensity for forming strong, committed relationships. From this social signaling perspective, grief targets old and new social partners, informing them that the griever is capable of forming strong social commitments. That is, because grief signals a person's capacity to form strong and faithful social bonds, those who displayed prolonged grief responses were preferentially chosen by alliance partners. The authors argue that throughout human evolution, grief was therefore shaped and elaborated by the social decisions of selective alliance partners.

Risks 

Bereavement, while a normal part of life, carries a degree of risk when severe. Severe reactions affect approximately 10% to 15% of people. Severe reactions mainly occur in people with depression present before the loss event. Severe grief reactions may carry over into family relations. Some researchers have found an increased risk of marital breakup following the death of a child, for example. Others have found no increase. John James, author of the Grief Recovery Handbook and founder of the Grief Recovery Institute, reported that his marriage broke up after the death of his infant son.

Health risks 
Many studies have looked at the bereaved in terms of increased risks for stress-related illnesses. Colin Murray Parkes in the 1960s and 1970s in England noted increased doctor visits, with symptoms such as abdominal pain, breathing difficulties, and so forth in the first six months following a death. Others have noted increased mortality rates (Ward, A.W. 1976) and Bunch et al. found a five times greater risk of suicide in teens following the death of a parent. Bereavement also increases the risk of heart attack.

Complicated grief 

Prolonged grief disorder (PGD), formerly known as complicated grief disorder (CGD), is a pathological reaction to loss representing a cluster of empirically derived symptoms that have been associated with long-term physical and psycho-social dysfunction. Individuals with PGD experience severe grief symptoms for at least six months and are stuck in a maladaptive state. An attempt is being made to create a diagnosis category for complicated grief in the DSM-5. It is currently an "area for further study" in the DSM, under the name Persistent Complex Bereavement Disorder. Critics of including the diagnosis of complicated grief in the DSM-5 say that doing so will constitute characterizing a natural response as a pathology, and will result in wholesale medicating of people who are essentially normal.

Shear and colleagues found an effective treatment for complicated grief, by treating the reactions in the same way as trauma reactions.

Complicated grief is not synonymous with grief. Complicated grief is characterised by an extended grieving period and other criteria, including mental and physical impairments. An important part of understanding complicated grief is understanding how the symptoms differ from normal grief. The Mayo Clinic states that with normal grief the feelings of loss are evident. When the reaction turns into complicated grief, however, the feelings of loss become incapacitating and continue even though time passes. The signs and symptoms characteristic of complicated grief are listed as "extreme focus on the loss and reminders of the loved one, intense longing or pining for the deceased, problems accepting the death, numbness or detachment ... bitterness about your loss, inability to enjoy life, depression or deep sadness, trouble carrying out normal routines, withdrawing from social activities, feeling that life holds no meaning or purpose, irritability or agitation, lack of trust in others". The symptoms seen in complicated grief are specific because the symptoms seem to be a combination of the symptoms found in separation as well as traumatic distress. They are also considered to be complicated because, unlike normal grief, these symptoms will continue regardless of the amount of time that has passed and despite treatment given from tricyclic antidepressants. Individuals with complicated grief symptoms are likely to have other mental disorders such as PTSD (post traumatic syndrome disorder), depression, anxiety, etc.

An article by the NEJM (The New England Journal of Medicine) states complicated grief cases are multifactorial, and that complicated grief is distinguished from major depression and post-traumatic stress disorder. Evidence shows that complicated grief is a more severe and prolonged version of acute grief than a completely different type of grief. While only affecting 2 to 3% of people in the world, complicated grief is usually contracted when a loved one dies suddenly and in a violent way.

In the study "Bereavement and Late-Life Depression: Grief and its Complications in the Elderly" six subjects with symptoms of complicated grief were given a dose of Paroxetine, a selective serotonin re-uptake inhibitor, and showed a 50% decrease in their symptoms within a three-month period. The Mental Health Clinical Research team theorizes that the symptoms of complicated grief in bereaved elderly are an alternative of post-traumatic stress. These symptoms were correlated with cancer, hypertension, anxiety, depression, suicidal ideation, increased smoking, and sleep impairments at around six months after spousal death.

A treatment that has been found beneficial in dealing with the symptoms associated with complicated grief is the use of serotonin specific reuptake inhibitors such as Paroxetine. These inhibitors have been found to reduce intrusive thoughts, avoidant behaviors, and hyperarousal that are associated with complicated grief. In addition psychotherapy techniques are in the process of being developed.

Disenfranchised grief 

Disenfranchised grief is a term describing grief that is not acknowledged by society. Examples of events leading to disenfranchised grief are the death of a friend, the loss of a pet, a trauma in the family a generation prior, the loss of a home or place of residence particularly in the case of children, who generally have little or no control in such situations, and whose grief may not be noticed or understood by caregivers. American military children and teens in particular move a great deal while growing up, an aborted or miscarried pregnancy, a parent's loss or surrender of a child to adoption, a child's loss of their birth parent to adoption, the death of a loved one due to a socially unacceptable cause such as suicide, or the death of a celebrity.

There are fewer support systems available for people who experience disenfranchised grief compared to those who are going through a widely recognized form of grief. Therefore, people who suffer disenfranchised grief undergo a more complicated grieving process. They may feel angry and depressed due to the lack of public validation which leads to the inability to fully express their sorrow. Moreover, they may not receive sufficient social support and feel isolated.

Examples of bereavement

Death of a child 

Death of a child can take the form of a loss in infancy such as miscarriage, stillbirth, neonatal death, SIDS, or the death of an older child. Among adults over the age of 50, approximately 11% have been predeceased by at least one of their offspring.

In most cases, parents find the grief almost unbearably devastating, and it tends to hold greater risk factors than any other loss. This loss also bears a lifelong process: one does not get 'over' the death but instead must assimilate and live with it. Intervention and comforting support can make all the difference to the survival of a parent in this type of grief but the risk factors are great and may include family breakup or suicide.

Feelings of guilt, whether legitimate or not, are pervasive, and the dependent nature of the relationship disposes parents to a variety of problems as they seek to cope with this great loss. Parents who suffer miscarriage or a regretful or coerced abortion may experience resentment towards others who experience successful pregnancies.

Suicide 

Parents may feel they cannot openly discuss their grief and feel their emotions because of how their child died and how the people around them may perceive the situation. Parents, family members and service providers have all confirmed the unique nature of suicide-related bereavement following the loss of a child. The difference in suicide-related bereavement is that there are different reactions and ways when we respond to the loss of someone we love dearly. Some examples are post-traumatic stress, family, and relationship tensions. Post-traumatic stress (PTS) can affect the person severely when witnessing the death of someone. It can give them horrible trauma and nightmares may occur making them have a lack sleep. Another reaction is family and relationship tensions. Having loved ones by their side could really support them, but some families might lack connections or communications with one another. They feel as if they are going to bring more burden to others. Some have different perspectives on themselves when communicating with others and might keep their feelings to themselves. It's a way to protect their inner feelings as if they're scared to share with others.

Death of a spouse 
Many widows and widowers describe losing 'half' of themselves. A factor is the manner in which the spouse died. The survivor of a spouse who died of an illness has a different experience of such loss than a survivor of a spouse who died by an act of violence. Often, the spouse who is "left behind" may suffer from depression and loneliness, and may feel it necessary to seek professional help in dealing with their new life.

Furthermore, most couples have a division of 'tasks' or 'labor', e.g., the husband mows the yard, the wife pays the bills, etc. which, in addition to dealing with great grief and life changes, means added responsibilities for the bereaved. Planning and financing a funeral can be very difficult if pre-planning was not completed. Changes in insurance, bank accounts, claiming of life insurance, securing childcare can also be intimidating to someone who is grieving. Social isolation may also become imminent, as many groups composed of couples find it difficult to adjust to the new identity of the bereaved, and the bereaved themselves have great challenges in reconnecting with others. Widows of many cultures, for instance, wear black for the rest of their lives to signify the loss of their spouse and their grief. Only in more recent decades has this tradition been reduced to a period of two years, while some religions such as Orthodox Christianity many widows will still continue to wear black for the remainder of their lives.

Death of a sibling 

Grieving siblings are often referred to as the 'forgotten mourners' who are made to feel as if their grief is not as severe as their parents' grief (N.a., 2015). However, the sibling relationship tends to be the longest significant relationship of the lifespan and siblings who have been part of each other's lives since birth, such as twins, help form and sustain each other's identities; with the death of one sibling comes the loss of that part of the survivor's identity because "your identity is based on having them there".

If siblings were not on good terms or close with each other, then intense feelings of guilt may ensue on the part of the surviving sibling (guilt may also ensue for having survived, not being able to prevent the death, having argued with their sibling, etc.)

Death of a parent

For an adult 
When an adult child loses a parent in later adulthood, it is considered to be "timely" and to be a normative life course event. This allows the adult children to feel a permitted level of grief. However, research shows that the death of a parent in an adult's midlife is not a normative event by any measure, but is a major life transition causing an evaluation of one's own life or mortality. Others may shut out friends and family in processing the loss of someone with whom they have had the longest relationship.

In developed countries, people typically lose parents after the age of 50.

For a child 
For a child, the death of a parent, without support to manage the effects of the grief, may result in long-term psychological harm. This is more likely if the adult carers are struggling with their own grief and are psychologically unavailable to the child. There is a critical role of the surviving parent or caregiver in helping the children adapt to a parent's death. However, losing a parent at a young age also has some positive effects. Some children had an increased maturity, better coping skills and improved communication. Adolescents who lost a parent valued other people more than those who have not experienced such a close loss.

Loss during childhood 

When a parent or caregiver dies or leaves, children may have symptoms of psychopathology, but they are less severe than in children with major depression. The loss of a parent, grandparent or sibling can be very troubling in childhood, but even in childhood there are age differences in relation to the loss. A very young child, under one or two, may be found to have no reaction if a carer dies, but other children may be affected by the loss.

At a time when trust and dependency are formed, even mere separation can cause problems in well-being. This is especially true if the loss is around critical periods such as 8–12 months, when attachment and separation are at their height and even a brief separation from a parent or other caregiver can cause distress.

Even as a child grows older, death is still difficult to fathom and this affects how a child responds. For example, younger children see death more as a separation, and may believe death is curable or temporary. Reactions can manifest themselves in "acting out" behaviors, a return to earlier behaviors such as thumb sucking, clinging to a toy or angry behavior. Though they do not have the maturity to mourn as an adult, they feel the same intensity. As children enter pre-teen and teen years, there is a more mature understanding.

Adolescents may respond by delinquency, or oppositely become "over-achievers". Repetitive actions are not uncommon such as washing a car repeatedly or taking up repetitive tasks such as sewing, computer games, etc. It is an effort to stay above the grief. Childhood loss can predispose a child not only to physical illness but to emotional problems and an increased risk for suicide, especially in the adolescent period.

Grief can be experienced as a result of losses due to causes other than death. For example, women who have been physically, psychologically or sexually abused often grieve over the damage to or the loss of their ability to trust. This is likely to be experienced as disenfranchised grief.

In relation to the specific issue of child sexual abuse, it has been argued by some commentators that the concepts of loss and grief offer particularly useful analytical frames for understanding both the impact of child sexual abuse and therapeutic ways to respond to it. From this perspective, child sexual abuse may represent for many children multiple forms of loss: not only of trust but also loss of control over their bodies, loss of innocence and indeed loss of their very childhoods.

Relocations can cause children significant grief particularly if they are combined with other difficult circumstances such as neglectful or abusive parental behaviors, other significant losses, etc.

Loss of a friend or classmate 

Children may experience the death of a friend or a classmate through illness, accidents, suicide, or violence. Initial support involves reassuring children that their emotional and physical feelings are normal.

Survivor guilt (or survivor's guilt; also called survivor syndrome or survivor's syndrome) is a mental condition that occurs when a person perceives themselves to have done wrong by surviving a traumatic event when others did not. It may be found among survivors of combat, natural disasters, epidemics, among the friends and family of those who have died by suicide, and in non-mortal situations such as among those whose colleagues are laid off.

Other losses 

Parents may grieve due to loss of children through means other than death, for example through loss of custody in divorce proceedings; legal termination of parental rights by the government, such as in cases of child abuse; through kidnapping; because the child voluntarily left home (either as a runaway or, for overage children, by leaving home legally); or because an adult refuses or is unable to have contact with a parent. This loss differs from the death of a child in that the grief process is prolonged or denied because of hope that the relationship will be restored.

Grief may occur after the loss of a romantic relationship (i.e. divorce or break up), a vocation, a pet (animal loss), a home, children leaving home (empty nest syndrome), sibling(s) leaving home, a friend, a faith in one's religion, etc. A person who strongly identifies with their occupation may feel a sense of grief if they have to stop their job due to retirement, being laid off, injury, or loss of certification. Those who have experienced a loss of trust will often also experience some form of grief.

Veteran bereavement 

The grief of living veteran soldiers is often ignored. Psychological effects and post traumatic syndrome disorder have been researched and studied but very few focus on grief and bereavement specifically. Additionally, there have been many studies conducted about families losing members who were in the military but little about soldiers themselves. There are many monuments paying respect to those who were lost which emphasizes the lack of focus living veterans and soldiers get in regards to grief.

Gradual bereavement 

Many of the above examples of bereavement happen abruptly, but there are also cases of being gradually bereft of something or someone. For example, the gradual loss of a loved one by Alzheimer's produces a "gradual grief".

The author Kara Tippetts described her dying of cancer, as dying "by degrees": her "body failing" and her "abilities vanishing". Milton Crum, writing about gradual bereavement says that "every degree of death, every death of a person's characteristics, every death of a person's abilities, is a bereavement".

Sensory experiences of the deceased
Bereaved people often report having sensory and quasi-sensory experiences of the deceased (SED), which were correlated with pathology like grief complications.

Support

Professional support 

Many people who grieve do not need professional help. Some, however, may seek additional support from licensed psychologists or psychiatrists. Support resources available to the bereaved may include grief counseling, professional support-groups or educational classes, and peer-led support groups. In the United States of America, local hospice agencies may provide a first contact for those seeking bereavement support.

It is important to recognize when grief has turned into something more serious, thus mandating contacting a medical professional. Grief can result in depression or alcohol- and drug-abuse and, if left untreated, it can become severe enough to impact daily living. It recommends contacting a medical professional if "you can't deal with grief, you are using excessive amounts of drugs or alcohol, you become very depressed, or you have prolonged depression that interferes with your daily life". Other reasons to seek medical attention may include: "Can focus on little else but your loved one's death, have persistent pining or longing for the deceased person, have thoughts of guilt or self-blame, believe that you did something wrong or could have prevented the death, feel as if life is not worth living, have lost your sense of purpose in life, wish you had died along with your loved one".

Professionals can use multiple ways to help someone cope and move through their grief. Hypnosis is sometimes used as an adjunct therapy in helping patients experiencing grief. Hypnosis enhances and facilitates mourning and helps patients to resolve traumatic grief. Art therapy may also be used to allow the bereaved to process their grief in a non-verbal way.

Lichtenthal and Cruess studied how bereavement-specific written disclosure had benefits in helping adjust to loss, and in helping improve the effects of post-traumatic stress disorder (PTSD), prolonged grief disorder, and depression. Directed writing helped many of the individuals who had experienced a loss of a significant relationship. It involved individuals trying to make meaning out of the loss through meaning-making (making sense of what happened and the cause of the death), or through benefit finding (consideration of the global significance of the loss of one's goals, and helping the family develop a greater appreciation of life). This meaning-making can come naturally for some, but many need direct intervention to "move on".

Support groups 

Support groups for bereaved individuals follow a diversity of patterns. Many are organized purely as peer-to-peer groups such as local chapters of the Compassionate Friends, an international group for bereaved parents. Other grief support groups are led by professionals, perhaps with the assistance of peers. Some support groups deal with specific problems, such as learning to plan meals and cook for only for one person.

Cultural differences in grieving 

Each culture specifies manners such as rituals, styles of dress, or other habits, as well as attitudes, in which the bereaved are encouraged or expected to take part. An analysis of non-Western cultures suggests that beliefs about continuing ties with the deceased varies. In Japan, maintenance of ties with the deceased is accepted and carried out through religious rituals. In the Hopi of Arizona, the women go into self-induced hallucinations where they conjure images of the deceased loved one to mourn and process their grief.

Different cultures grieve in different ways, but all have ways that are vital in healthy coping with the death of a loved one. The American family's approach to grieving was depicted in "The Grief Committee", by T. Glen Coughlin. The short story gives an inside look at how the American culture has learned to cope with the tribulations and difficulties of grief. The story is taught in the course, "The Politics of Mourning: Grief Management in a Cross-Cultural Fiction" at Columbia University.

In those with cognitive impairment 

Contrary to the belief that those who have a high degree of cognitive impairment, such as an intellectual disability, are unable to process the loss of those around them, those with cognitive impairments are able to process grief in a similar manner to those without cognitive impairment. One of the main differences between those with an intellectual disability and those without is typically the ability to verbalize their feelings about the loss, which is why non-verbal cues and changes in behavior become so important, because these are usually signs of distress and expression of grief among this population. It is important when working with individuals with these such impairments that caregivers and family members meet them where their level of functioning is and allow them to process the loss and grief with assistance given where needed, and not to ignore the grief that these individuals undergo. An important aspect of treatment of grief for those with an intellectual disability is family involvement where possible, which may take the form of a biological family or a family created in a group home or clinical setting. By having the family involved in an open and supporting dialogue with the individual it helps them to process. However, if the family is not properly educated on how these individuals handle loss, their involvement may not be as beneficial than those who are educated. The importance of the family unit is very crucial in a socio-cognitive approach to bereavement counseling. In this approach the individual with intellectual disability has the opportunity to see how those around them handle the loss and have the opportunity to act accordingly by modeling behavior. This approach also helps the individual know that their emotions are acceptable and normal.

In animals 

Previously it was believed that grief was only a human emotion, but studies have shown that other animals have shown grief or grief-like states during the death of another animal, most notably elephants, wolves, apes, and goats. This can occur between bonded animals which are animals that attempt to survive together (i.e. a pack of wolves or mated prairie voles). Animals are bonded species like humans. There is evidence that animals experience grief in the loss of their group member, a mate, or their owner for many days. Some animals show their grief for their loss for many years. When animals are grieving, their life routines change the same as humans. For instance, they may stop eating, isolate themselves, or change their sleeping routine by taking naps instead of sleeping during the night. After the death of their group member or a mate, some of the animals become depressed, while others like the bonobo keep the dead bodies of their babies for a long time. Cats try to find their dead fellow with a mourning cry, and dogs and horses become depressed.

Since it is more difficult to study emotion in animals because of the lack of clear communication, in effort to study grief, research has been done on hormone levels. One study found that "females [baboons] showed significant increases in stress hormones called glucocorticoids". The female baboons then increased grooming, promoting physical touch, which releases "oxytocin, which inhibits glucocorticoid release".

Mammals 
Mammals have demonstrated grief-like states, especially between a mother and her offspring. She will often stay close to her dead offspring for short periods of time and may investigate the reasons for the baby's non-response. For example, some deer will often sniff, poke, and look at its lifeless fawn before realizing it is dead and leaving it to rejoin the herd shortly afterwards. Other animals, such as a lioness, will pick up its cub in its mouth and place it somewhere else before abandoning it.

When a baby chimpanzee or gorilla dies, the mother will carry the body around for several days before she may finally be able to move on without it; this behavior has been observed in other primates, as well. The Royal Society suggests that, "Such interactions have been proposed to be related to maternal condition, attachment, environmental conditions or reflect a lack of awareness that the infant has died." Jane Goodall has described chimpanzees as exhibiting mournful behavior toward the loss of a group member with silence and by showing more attention to it. And they will often continue grooming it and stay close to the carcass until the group must move on without it. One example of this Goodall observed was of a chimpanzee mother of three who had died. The siblings stayed by their mother's body the whole day. Of the three siblings the youngest showed the most agitation by screaming and became depressed but was able to recover by the care of the two older siblings. However, the youngest refused behavior from the siblings that were similar to the mother. Another notable example is Koko, a gorilla who was taught sign language, who expressed sadness and even described sadness about the death of her pet cat, All Ball.

Elephants, have shown unusual behavior upon encountering the remains of another deceased elephant. They will often investigate it by touching and grabbing it with their trunks and have the whole herd stand around it for long periods of time until they must leave it behind. It is unknown whether they are mourning over it and showing sympathy, or are just curious and investigating the dead body. Elephants are thought to be able to discern relatives even from their remains. When encountering the body of a deceased elephant or human, elephants have been witnessed covering the body with vegetation and soil in what seems to be burial behavior. An episode of the seminal BBC documentary series Life on Earth shows this in detail – the elephants, upon finding a dead herd member, pause for several minutes at a time, and carefully touch and hold the dead creature's bones.

Birds 
Some birds seem to lack the perception of grief or quickly accept it; mallard hens, although shocked for a moment when losing one of their young to a predator, will soon return to doing what they were doing before the predator attacked. However, some other waterbirds, such as mute swans are known to grieve for the loss of a partner or cygnet, and are known to engage in pining for days, weeks or even months at a time. Other species of swans such as the black swan have also been observed mourning the loss of a close relative.

Monogamous animals 
Another form of grief in animals is when an individual loses its mate; this can be especially brutal when the species is monogamous. So when a pair bonding species, such as a black-backed jackal, loses its mate it can be very difficult for it to detach itself from its dead mate.

See also

References

Further reading 
 

 Hoy, William G. (2016). Bereavement Groups and the Role of Social Support: Integrating Theory, Research, and Practice. New York: Routledge.
 
 
 Schmid, Wilhelm, What We Gain as We Grow Older: On Gelassenheit. New York: Upper West Side Philosophers, Inc. 2016 (Living Now Gold Award)
 
 Smith, Melinda; Robinson, Lawrence; Segal, Jeanne. (1997). Depression in Older Adults and the Elderly. Helpguide, Retrieved 8 February 2012.
 Span, Paula. (29 December 2011). The unspoken diagnosis: Old age. The New York Times. Retrieved 8 February 2012
 Stengel, Kathrin, November Rose: A Speech on Death. New York: Upper West Side Philosophers, Inc. 2007 (Independent Publisher Book Award for Aging/Death & Dying)

External links 

 "Grieving:  A study of bereavement" by Megan O'Rourke at Slate.com
 "Grief & Bereavement – An Overview by Associated Counsellors & Psychologists

 
Counseling
Funeral-related industry
Emotions